The 2010 All-Australian team represents the best performed Australian Football League (AFL) players during the 2010 season. It was announced on 13 September as a complete Australian rules football team of 22 players. An initial squad of 40 players was previously announced on 30 August. The team is honorary and does not play any games.

Selection panel
The selection panel for the 2010 All-Australian team consisted of chairman Andrew Demetriou, Adrian Anderson, Kevin Bartlett, Gerard Healy, James Hird, Glen Jakovich, Mark Ricciuto and Robert Walls. Healy and Walls both announced their retirement from the panel and therefore the 2010 season was their last as selectors.

Team

Initial squad
A squad of 40 players was selected on 30 August. There was a change from the tradition of previous years and instead of players being selected by position, the selectors simply chose who they considered to be the 40 best performers for the season. Eight players who had been selected in the 2009 team did not make the 2010 squad, including 2009 captain Nick Riewoldt, Matthew Scarlett, Nick Maxwell, Simon Goodwin, Brendan Fevola, Leon Davis, Jonathan Brown and Craig Bolton.

Final team
The 2010 All-Australian team was announced on 13 September. Players to make the squad for the first time were Harry Taylor, Jack Riewoldt, Scott Pendlebury, Harry O'Brien, Mark LeCras, Mark Jamar and James Frawley. No current team captains were named on the field (Chris Judd, captain of Carlton, was named on the bench) and so the selectors named  vice-captain Luke Hodge as the captain instead. 2009 Brownlow Medallist Gary Ablett Jr. was named vice-captain, although he was neither a captain or vice-captain at the time.

Of the 18 players from the squad of 40 who missed out, the non-selections of Fremantle's Matthew Pavlich, St Kilda's Lenny Hayes, Melbourne's Brad Green and 2008 Brownlow Medallist Adam Cooney were considered the most contentious. Hayes, in particular, was considered a surprise, with St Kilda teammate and All-Australian wingman Leigh Montagna saying: "I was very surprised Lenny wasn't in the team... I pencilled him in for a captain or vice-captain. It's a big shock." Pavlich's non-selection also raised some eyebrows, with many experts predicting that the Fremantle captain would be selected in what would have been his seventh All-Australian side.

Note: the position of coach in the All-Australian team is traditionally awarded to the coach of the premiership team.

References

All-Australian Team, 2010
All-Australian Team